Marek Salermo (born 16 January 1978) is a Finnish former racing cyclist. He finished in second place in the Finnish National Road Race Championships in 2005.

References

External links

1978 births
Living people
Finnish male cyclists
Sportspeople from Helsinki